Whose Daughter Is She? is a CBS original television film directed by Frank Arnold. It premiered on September 24, 1995 in the United States on CBS. The film stars Stephanie Zimbalist, Gaby Hoffmann, Joanna Kerns, Lisa Wilhoit, Michael Shulman and others. It is also known as Semi-Precious, Moms and For the Love of My Daughter.

Premise
Two mothers, one biological (Zimbalist), one step-mom (Kerns), fight for the custody and love of 13-year-old Andrea (Hoffmann).

References

External links
 
 

1995 films
1990s English-language films
1995 drama films
American drama films
Films scored by John Frizzell (composer)
Films directed by Frank Arnold
1990s American films